Princely Rajendran Selvanayagam (born 10 August 1936) was a Sri Lankan Tamil politician and Member of Parliament.

Selvanayagam stood as an independent candidate in Batticaloa at the 1970 parliamentary election. He came second and entered Parliament as the second member for Batticaloa. He failed to be re-elected at the 1977 parliamentary election after coming fifth.

References

1936 births
Living people
Members of the 7th Parliament of Ceylon
People from Eastern Province, Sri Lanka
People from British Ceylon
Sri Lankan Tamil politicians